Jojo Khalastra was an Israeli satiric character played by Zvika Hadar in 1994–1995.

Jojo Khalastra appeared on The Comedy Store, a show on Israel Television's Channel Two, as the iconic Mizrahi ars, a Hebrew slang term derived from Arabic referring to a stereotyped male character who wears flashy jewelry and clothing. Khalastra debuted in 1994 and soon became the show's signature character. With his leopard-skin shirt and a trademark hairdo, Khalastra was known for his malapropisms and humorous yet insightful take on social affairs in Israel.

From his name and accent, it is clear that Jojo represents a stereotypical Moroccan Jew. "Khalastra" is an invented word that the character uses to describe his hot-blooded response to perceived slights.

The role of Jojo Khalastra turned Hadar into a cultural icon among young Israelis and the show was deemed a runaway success.

See also 
 Culture of Israel
Television in Israel

References

External links 
 Jojo Khalastra on youtube

Television in Israel
Fictional Israeli Jews